has been categorized as one of the greatest exponents of the art of judo after the founder, Kanō Jigorō. He is considered by many to be the greatest judo technician ever, after Kanō.

Early life
Mifune was born on April 21, 1883, in Kuji City, Iwate Prefecture, on Honshū Island in Japan, a year after the Kodokan was founded. He was reportedly incorrigible as a boy, always performing some mischief or organizing others in a similar pursuit. When Mifune was 13 years old, his father, a strict disciplinarian who finally gave up on the youngest of his seven children, sent the boy to a junior high school at Sendai, in northern Japan. There, the young Mifune discovered judo, and decided to dedicate himself to it. At age 14, he defeated nine opponents in a row at one tournament with another high school. At the end of his time in Sendai, in 1903, he faced veteran master Matsugoro Okuda in a sparring match in his dojo. Okuda won easily, but he praised Mifune's skills highly and predicted he would become a legend of the art.

After graduating, Mifune was sent to a Tokyo preparatory school, anticipating entry into Waseda University. He immediately attempted to join the Kodokan. In those days, this required a personal interview with Kano, upon the recommendation of ranking judoka, and then signing a blood oath. Mifune did not know anyone at the Kodokan, but picked out Sakujiro Yokoyama, who then had a fearsome reputation, as 'Demon Yokoyama,' whose fast, powerful judo had gained much reputation for the Kodokan. Mifune camped at Yokoyama's doorstep until the latter consented to recommend him to Kano. In July 1903, Mifune joined the Kodokan, and the next year he joined Waseda University too. However his father, finding out he was spending more time at judo than studying, cut off his allowance, and Mifune, now 22, went out to find work. He began a newspaper, sold advertising, and built it into a thriving enterprise. He was able to sell it at a substantial profit, and entered the economics program at Keio University.

Career

After 15 months of training, Mifune achieved the rank of shodan ("beginning dan, indicating 1st dan ranking) in Kodokan judo, and after the remarkably short time of four more months, nidan (2nd dan). Through timing and speed, Mifune quickly gained a reputation, and was never defeated at the annual Red and White Kodokan tournament. By 1910, he was ranked godan (5th dan) and an instructor. He was already being called the "God of Judo". He was 30. His father recommended a girl in his hometown and, for only the second time since he had left home, he returned, to marry.

During the next 20 years, Mifune's reputation continued to grow. He became 6th dan (rokudan) in 1917 and 7th dan (shichidan) in 1923. When he was 40, he was challenged by a 6′ tall and 240 lb. sumo wrestler. Mifune, 5′ 2″ tall and 100 lb., finally slammed the wrestler with his trademark "airplane" throw (kuki nage or sumi otoshi). He ate sparingly, slept on a Western-style bed, and did not smoke. In 1931, Kano promoted Mifune to 8th dan (hachidan) and in 1937 to the rank of kudan (9th dan).

With Kano's death in 1938, Mifune became the most influential instructor. Students had long complained that Mifune would get carried away with lectures, and he was "feared more than loved." On May 25, 1945, he was promoted to judan (10th dan), the fourth of 15 judoka to ever be so honored. Mifune was given the title of Hanshi then Meijin by the International Martial Arts Federation (IMAF) and In 1956, he wrote his classic book, The Canon of Judo, still a remarkable exposition of judo history, philosophy, and technical description. To E. J. Harrison, he wrote a book foreword that was simple but expressed Mifune's philosophical nature: "Freedom in continuous change!"

Trevor Leggett, a frequent visitor to the Kodokan over many years, remarked that judo was much "rougher" at the Kodokan prior to World War II than afterward; this was, perhaps, the influence of Mifune.

Awards and honors
In 1964 Mifune was awarded the Order of the Rising Sun (3rd Class).

Death
Mifune died on January 27, 1965, of throat cancer, in the Nichidai University Hospital in Tokyo.

Anecdotes
In his book The Fighting Spirit of Japan (published in 1913), E.J. Harrison writes about an anecdote as told to him by Sakujiro Yokoyama:

See also 
 The Canon of Judo

References

External links 

 . A 63 minute film that shows Mifune demonstrating judo techniques, kata, randori, and counters. This is an excellent complement to his book The Canon of Judo.

1883 births
1965 deaths
Japanese male judoka
Judoka trainers
People from Iwate Prefecture
Recipients of the Medal with Purple Ribbon
Kodokan 10th dans